Lee Martyn Rogers (born 8 April 1967) is an English former professional footballer who played as a defender in the Football League for Bristol City, Hereford United, York City and Exeter City, and in non-League football for Gloucester City.

References

1967 births
Living people
Footballers from Bristol
English footballers
Association football defenders
Bristol City F.C. players
Hereford United F.C. players
York City F.C. players
Exeter City F.C. players
Gloucester City A.F.C. players
English Football League players